The Skewb is a combination puzzle and a mechanical puzzle in the style of the Rubik's Cube. It was invented by Tony Durham and marketed by Uwe Mèffert. Although it is cubical in shape, it differs from Rubik's construction in that its axes of rotation pass through the corners of the cube rather than the centres of the faces. There are four such axes, one for each space diagonal of the cube. As a result, it is a deep-cut puzzle in which each twist affects all six faces.

Mèffert's original name for this puzzle was the Pyraminx Cube, to emphasize that it was part of a series including his first tetrahedral puzzle. the Pyraminx. The catchier name Skewb was coined by Douglas Hofstadter in his Metamagical Themas column. Mèffert liked the new name enough to apply it to the Pyraminx Cube, and also named some of his other puzzles after it, such as the Skewb Diamond.

Higher-order Skewbs, named Master Skewb and Elite Skewb, have also been made.

In December 2013, Skewb was recognized as an official World Cube Association competition event.

Mechanism 

Despite a simple appearance, its pieces are actually divided into subgroups and have restrictions that are apparent upon examining the puzzle's mechanism. The eight corners are split into two groups—the four corners attached to the central four-armed spider and the four "floating" corners that can be removed from the mechanism easily. These corners cannot be interchanged i.e. in a single group of four corners, their relative positions are unchanged. They can be distinguished by applying pressure on the corner—if it squishes down a bit, it's a floating corner. The centers only have two possible orientations—this becomes apparent either by scrambling a Skewb-alike puzzle where the center orientation is visible (such as the Skewb Diamond or Skewb Ultimate), or by disassembling the puzzle.

Records 
The world record time (single) for a Skewb is 0.81 seconds, set by Zayn Khanani of the United States on 9 July 2022 at the Rubik's WCA North American Championship 2022 in Toronto, Canada.

The world record average of 5 (excluding fastest and slowest) is 1.73 seconds, also set by Zayn Khanani on 10 July 2022 at the Rubik's WCA North American Championship 2022, with the times of 2.04, 4.47, 1.41, 1.38, and 1.73 seconds.

Top 5 solvers by single solve

Top 5 solvers by average of 5 solves

See also 

 Dino Cube
 Dogic
 Megaminx
 Pocket Cube
 Professor's Cube
 Pyraminx Duo
 Pyraminx
 Rubik's Revenge
 V-Cube 6
 V-Cube 7
 V-Cube 8

References

External links 
 Birgit Nietsch's Skewb page
 Jaap's Skewb page
 Kirjava-Meep Skewb Method proposed by Thom Barlow and Kristopher De Asis.
 Sarah Strong's Skewb Method with variations for all skill levels.
 Rubik'skewb solution by Hideki Niina.
 Ranzha's Skewb Method by Brandon Harnish.

Logic puzzles
Mechanical puzzle cubes